Abdullino (Abdulla) is a rural locality (a village) and the administrative centre of Abdullinsky Selsoviet of Mechetlinsky District, Bashkortostan, Russia. The population was 510 as of 2010. There are 15 streets.

Geography 
Abdullino is located 30 km northwest of Bolsheustyikinskoye (the district's administrative centre) by road. Zhvakino is the nearest rural locality.

Ethnicity 
The village is inhabited by Tatars, Bashkirs and others.

References 

Rural localities in Mechetlinsky District